The Storm That Kissed Me is a 2018 Burmese drama film, directed by  Aung Zaw Lin and Win Lwin Htet starring  Hlwan Paing, Yair Yint Aung and Phway Phway. The film, produced by Bo Bo Film Production, premiered in Myanmar on June 1, 2018.

Cast
Hlwan Paing as Nay Nyo Thwin
Yair Yint Aung as Aww Ra Htoo
Phway Phway as Wint Shin Pyo
Nay Aung as U Aung
Ye Aung as U Htoo Aung
Myat Kay Thi Aung as Mother of Wint Shin Pyo

References

2018 films
2010s Burmese-language films
Burmese drama films
Films shot in Myanmar
2018 drama films